The Declaration of Independence in 1912 and the subsequent formation of the Independent Albanian State created framework conditions for the organizing and safekeeping of documents. For the first time, the assessment of documents and their administration and preservation is reflected in the highest normative act of the state, enacted in the Provisional Kanun of the Vlora Government (22 November 1913).

List of archives

History of the archives 
The first document stored in the Central State Archive, which deals with efforts to create a Central Archive, is the decision dated 2 January 1932 of the High State Council for reviewing the draft-regulation for the registration of important events. In this draft-regulation, it was foreseen the creation of a General State Archive.

World War II 
World War II slowed the initiatives undertaken by state authorities for the creation of a centralized system of archives. During this period, documents and records were preserved and managed by the administration of the institution which they belonged to. This collection of documents and records enabled the creation of a large archival database, which became the foundation of a future Central State Archive.

Communism 
Efforts to create a central archive continued after the war. In 1947, the "Documentary Archive of the Institute" was created at the Institute of Studies. It collected a considerable amount of historical documents kept by state institutions or individuals, thus taking on the attributes of a Central Archive, but not with all the features of such an entity.

The Central State Archive was finally established as a central body, although subordinated to the Institute of Studies, by the Council of Ministers Order No. 21, dated 8 June 1949.

See also 
 List of archives
 List of libraries in Albania
 List of museums in Albania

References 

 
Archives
Albania
Archives